High Point station is an intermodal transit station in High Point, North Carolina, United States. Its main building serves as an Amtrak train station, while the Broad Avenue Terminal serves as the bus terminus for both High Point Transit System (HPTS) and the Piedmont Authority for Regional Transportation (PART). The station is located in downtown High Point and near the West High Street Historic District.

History

High Point Station was originally built in 1907, by Southern Railway, and was designed in Richardsonian Romanesque, with a rusticated ashlar base and a tiled hip roof. In the late 1930s, a trench was dug so rail and automobile traffic would not impede each other through downtown High Point; a walkway across the tracks and a staircase to an island platform at track level was constructed. In 1979, Amtrak took over passenger operations at the station from Southern Railway. Between 2002 and 2003, a $6.8 million renovation project was done that included making the station ADA compliant; the station reopened on December 9, 2003.

Services
Amtrak operating hours are at 12:00am–4:00am, 7:00am–12:30pm and 3:30pm–9:00pm; it includes a Quik-Trak kiosk, waiting area and restrooms. No baggage service is available at this station. A station attendant is available on-site during operating hours.

Broad Avenue Terminal
The Broad Avenue Terminal, operated by HPTS, provides local bus service that operate Monday-Friday at 5:45am–7:30pm and Saturday at 8:45am–5:30pm, closed on Sunday. PART also operates two intercity bus routes from the terminal, Route 3 (High Point Express) and Route 9 (Davidson Business 85 Express), which travel to Greensboro and Thomasville/Lexington respectively.

Amtrak Thruway service to Winston-Salem State University (Union Station) and Winston-Salem (Clark Campbell Transportation Center) is provided four times a day, Monday–Saturday. This service is operated by PART, designated as Route 5 (NC Amtrak Connector). Amtrak bus departing designations are #6173, #6175, #6177, and #6179; arriving designations are #6174, #6176, #6178, and #6180.

Station layout
The station's island platform is located in the trench, connected to the walkway by stairs and an elevator.

References

External links 

High Point Station – NC By Train
High Point Amtrak Station (USA Rail Guide -- Train Web)

Buildings and structures in High Point, North Carolina
Amtrak stations in North Carolina
Stations along Southern Railway lines in the United States
1907 establishments in North Carolina